Acraea alciopoides is a butterfly in the family Nymphalidae. It is found in the Democratic Republic of the Congo (from the eastern part of the country to Ituri), western Uganda and north-western Tanzania. The habitat consists of forests.

Taxonomy
It is a member of the Acraea jodutta  species group-   but see also Pierre & Bernaud, 2014

References

Butterflies described in 1921
alciopoides